Lawrie Robert Wilson (born 11 September 1987) is an English footballer who plays as a right-back for  club Billericay Town.

Wilson started his career at Charlton Athletic, and played regularly for the club's under-18 and reserve teams until he was released in 2006. He joined Colchester United ahead of the 2006–07 season, but did not make any first-team appearances during his one-year stay with the club. During his time at Colchester, he was loaned out to Conference South club Welling United, making four appearances during his one-month loan spell. Wilson signed for Hertfordshire club Stevenage in August 2007, and went on to make 190 appearances for the club over five seasons. During this time, he helped the club win the FA Trophy in May 2009, as well as being part of the team that earned back-to-back promotions from the Conference Premier into League One.

He rejoined his first club, Charlton Athletic, for an undisclosed fee in July 2012. He stayed with the club for three seasons, making 96 appearances in the Championship. A move to Bolton Wanderers followed in August 2015, where he was loaned out to Peterborough United in January 2016, who were managed by former Stevenage manager Graham Westley. Bolton were relegated at the end of the 2015–16 season, before he played 26 times throughout the 2016–17 campaign as they won promotion out of League One at the first attempt. He signed with Port Vale in July 2017, before moving on to Ebbsfleet United six months later. He was loaned out to Maidstone United in September 2018. In July 2020, he joined Billericay Town of the National League South.

Club career

Early career
Wilson began his career as a trainee with Charlton Athletic, and was a regular in the club's under-18 team, where he played in defence. He progressed through the club's youth system, and featured in Charlton's reserve team throughout the club's 2005–06 campaign, making 16 appearances for the reserves as a second-year scholar. However, he did not make any first-team appearances and was subsequently allowed to search for a new club. In February 2006, he played for Luton Town's reserve team in a match against Stevenage Borough reserves at Kenilworth Road, although no transfer ultimately materialised. He was released by Charlton in April 2006.

A month later, Wilson went on trial at League Two club Shrewsbury Town, and played the whole match in Shrewsbury's 2–1 pre-season friendly home win against Rotherham United, although he was unsuccessful in his attempt to earn a professional contract with the club. In August 2006, Wilson signed a one-year deal with Colchester United. Similarly to his time at Charlton, Wilson played regularly for the club's reserve team throughout the 2006–07 season, but did not make any first-team appearances. He was loaned out to Conference South club Welling United in December 2006. He made his debut for Welling in the club's 1–0 win away at Cambridge City, but was sent-off after just 27 minutes for violent conduct. He returned to first-team action in Welling's 0–0 draw with Basingstoke Town at Park View Road in the FA Trophy, and went on to play four times for Welling during his one-month loan spell at the club. On returning to Layer Road, Wilson was released at the end of the 2006–07 season, without making a first-team appearance for Colchester. Ahead of the 2007–08 season, Wilson spent pre-season trialling at Brentford and Stockport County respectively, training with Stockport for a number of weeks and playing in several pre-season friendlies, but was ultimately not offered a contract.

Stevenage
Wilson signed for Stevenage of the Conference Premier on 16 August 2007, joining on a one-year contract. Manager Mark Stimson gave Wilson his Stevenage debut a day after signing for the club, coming on as an 86th-minute substitute in Stevenage's 3–0 win against Weymouth on 17 August 2007. Wilson played 27 times during his first season at Stevenage, with the majority of his appearances coming in the second half of 2007–08 season. The following season under the new management of Graham Westley, Wilson played regularly in both the full-back position and at right midfield. Wilson scored his first professional goal in Stevenage's 3–1 away win at Barrow on 30 August 2008, taking advantage of a goalkeeping error in the 75th minute of the match to secure Stevenage's first win of the 2008–09 season. He was also sent-off for the first time in Stevenage colours in the club's 3–1 home defeat to Histon in November 2008, picking up the red card for "offensive language". Wilson returned to the first-team at the start of December and remained in the first-team until the end of the season. He subsequently played in both of Stevenage's Conference Premier play-off games against Cambridge United, as the club lost 4–3 on aggregate. Wilson's versatility also came into use during the club's successful FA Trophy campaign during the same season, as he played in four different positions in six of Stevenage's FA Trophy fixtures. He was deployed at left midfield in Stevenage's 2–0 win against York City in the Final at Wembley Stadium on 9 May 2009.

Wilson started in Stevenage's first game of the 2009–10 season in a 1–1 draw against Tamworth, adopting a much more attacking midfield role on the right wing. He scored his first goal of the season in a 3–0 win over Ebbsfleet United on 18 August 2009, latching onto Ronnie Henry's ball before lashing the ball past the goalkeeper to give Stevenage a three-goal lead. Two weeks later, in Stevenage's 2–1 victory against Rushden & Diamonds, Wilson suffered a "career threatening injury" following a tackle from Michael Corcoran, which resulted in Wilson suffering a dislocated ankle and broken leg in three places. Wilson had a successful operation the following day and was expected to miss the rest of the 2009–10 season. Wilson returned earlier than anticipated, playing in a reserve match against Ipswich Town in March 2010, and he made his return to the first-team a week later against Luton Town, coming on as a 65th-minute substitute. Two days later, Wilson started his first game in just over eight months against AFC Wimbledon. He scored Stevenage's second goal, scoring a half volley from Joel Byrom's chipped pass in Stevenage's 3–0 win at Kingsmeadow. He also played in the club's 2–0 win against Kidderminster Harriers at Aggborough in April 2010 – the game that secured Stevenage's place in Football League for the first time in the club's history. Wilson played 13 matches during the season, scoring twice. At the end of the season, Wilson signed a contract to keep him at the club until July 2011.

Wilson played in Stevenage's first fixture of the 2010–11 season, playing 72 minutes in the club's 2–2 draw with Macclesfield Town. In September 2010, he was sent-off in a game against Cheltenham Town at Whaddon Road, receiving a red card for two bookable offences. He signed a new contract with the club on 24 September 2010, keeping him at Stevenage until 2012. He scored his first goal of the 2010–11 season in Stevenage's 2–2 draw against Accrington Stanley on 5 February 2011. A month later, Wilson scored both of Stevenage's goals in a 2–1 home win against Lincoln City on 19 March 2011, his second goal coming from 25 yards out after an interchange with John Mousinho. He scored his fourth goal of the season on 9 April, netting an injury-time equaliser in a 2–2 draw at Stockport County. Wilson scored his fifth goal of the season on 25 April, scoring the only goal of the game in Stevenage's 1–0 home win against Port Vale. He scored five goals in 50 appearances during the club's 2010–11 campaign, as Stevenage earned promotion to League One for the first time in their history.

Wilson was part of the starting eleven in Stevenage's first League One fixture at the start of the 2011–12 season, playing the whole game as the club drew 0–0 at home to Exeter City. Wilson signed a contract extension at the club on 19 August 2011. Wilson scored his first goal of the 2011–12 season in a 5–1 home win over Sheffield Wednesday, scoring Stevenage's fourth goal of the match just before half-time. Wilson scored six times during the season, with the player being ever-present during the campaign under both Westley and new manager Gary Smith, playing in all 56 of the club's games, as Stevenage narrowly lost in the play-off semi-finals.

Charlton Athletic
Wilson was linked with a transfer to Peterborough United in the summer of 2012, as well as Charlton Athletic. Stevenage confirmed that they had received two bids for the player, both of which were from Championship clubs. In July 2012, Wilson signed for Charlton, the club he began his football career with, for an undisclosed fee. He made his debut for Charlton in the club's opening game of the 2012–13 season, a 1–1 draw with Leyton Orient in the League Cup at The Valley on 14 August 2012, which Charlton went on to lose 4–3 on penalties after extra-time. Wilson scored his first goal for the club during his tenth league appearance, scoring from close range to restore parity in a 1–1 draw with Wolverhampton Wanderers at Molineux on 27 October 2012. After a month out of first-team action, Wilson returned for Charlton's 2–2 home draw with Brighton & Hove Albion on 8 December, and scored the first goal of the match courtesy of a header from Dale Stephens' cross. It turned out to be Wilson's last goal of the season, a season in which he made 32 appearances as Charlton finished in ninth position in the Championship, three points behind the final play-off place.

He made 49 appearances across the 2013–14 season as Charlton posted an 18th-place finish under new manager José Riga. He competed with Chris Solly and Joe Gomez at the start of the 2014–15 season. Wilson joined Championship rivals Rotherham United on an emergency-loan on 20 March 2015. Rotherham manager Steve Evans hinted that the loan move would allow him to evaluate whether or not to sign Wilson permanently in the summer. He played three games for Rotherham during his time there.

Bolton Wanderers
Wilson signed for Bolton Wanderers on 5 August 2015, joining on a two-year deal. Initially the club's first choice right-back, he was not selected by manager Neil Lennon after putting in a poor performance during a 4–1 defeat at Huddersfield Town on 19 September 2015. He joined League One club Peterborough United on 2 January 2016, on a one-month loan agreement. He said that re-uniting with former Stevenage manager Graham Westley was a factor in the move to the London Road Stadium. Wilson played four times during the loan, starting as a substitute in their game with Sheffield United, and made his final appearance in the 2–2 draw with West Bromwich Albion in the FA Cup. He returned to Bolton and was recalled to the first-team by interim manager Jimmy Phillips for the final two games of the 2015–16 season.

Wilson regained his first-team place at Bolton following an injury to Lewis Buxton in September, and then established himself at right-back under manager Phil Parkinson. He was ruled out of first-team action for 10 weeks with a hamstring injury that he picked up during a 1–1 draw at Milton Keynes Dons on 4 February 2017. Bolton went on to secure promotion at the end of the 2016–17 season, though Wilson was released after the club decided not to offer him a new contract.

Port Vale
Following his departure from Bolton, Wilson signed a two-year contract with newly relegated League Two club Port Vale on 15 July 2017, after manager Michael Brown needed to replace departing right-back and club captain Ben Purkiss. He was not included in the first-team under new manager Neil Aspin, and was not in the matchday squad despite suspensions for James Gibbons and injuries to Adam Yates and Joe Davis.

Ebbsfleet United
Having not played for Port Vale in over three months, Wilson joined National League club Ebbsfleet United on 9 January 2018. He was signed by manager Daryl McMahon, his former teammate at Stevenage. He made his Ebbsfleet debut on the same day his signing was announced, playing the whole match in a 2–1 victory at Maidstone United. He made 17 appearances for the club during the second half of the season, including playing twice in the National League play-offs as Ebbsfleet lost at the semi-final stage.

He made two appearances for Ebbsfleet in the opening two months of the 2018–19 season. He subsequently joined fellow National League club Maidstone United on a month-long loan in order to get game-time. He made his Maidstone debut in a 1–0 away victory at Aldershot Town on 25 September 2018, making four appearances during the loan spell. Wilson returned to Ebbsfleet upon the expiry of his loan agreement with Maidstone, and went on to make 28 appearances throughout the season. He made 21 appearances for Ebbsfleet during the 2019–20 season, which was permanently suspended on 26 March 2020 due to the COVID-19 pandemic in England, with Ebbsfleet in the relegation zone in 21st-place. Wilson left Ebbsfleet on 29 June 2020, upon the expiry of his contract.

Billericay Town
Wilson joined National League South club Billericay Town on 4 August 2020. He made 14 appearances before the 2020–21 season was curtailed due to restrictions associated with the COVID-19 pandemic. Manager Kevin Watson was sacked in October 2021, and as captain Wilson was tasked with assisting caretaker manager Danny Brown in preparing the team for future matches. Wilson played 15 games as the "Blues" were relegated in last place at the end of the 2021–22 campaign. Brown stayed on as manager though, and speaking in May 2022 said that Wilson "will be a squad player, a coach, assistant manager and him as Ash [Goss] will continue with the 23s as well".

International career
Wilson was called up to play for the England C team on 27 August 2009, who represent England at non-league level, in a game against Hungary C in Budapest. However, he withdrew from the squad after suffering a dislocated ankle and broken leg just three days later.

Style of play
Wilson is primarily a right-back, but is also adept at playing on the right-side of midfield, and can also fill in at left-back, central midfield or the left-hand side of midfield if needed. Describing himself, he has said that "I might not be this 9/10 every week player, but I become reliable".

Career statistics

Honours
Stevenage
FA Trophy: 2008–09; runner-up: 2009–10 
Conference Premier: 2009–10
League Two play-offs: 2010–11

Bolton Wanderers
League One second-place promotion: 2016–17

References

1987 births
Living people
English footballers
Association football fullbacks
Association football midfielders
Charlton Athletic F.C. players
Colchester United F.C. players
Welling United F.C. players
Stevenage F.C. players
Rotherham United F.C. players
Bolton Wanderers F.C. players
Peterborough United F.C. players
Port Vale F.C. players
Ebbsfleet United F.C. players
Maidstone United F.C. players
Billericay Town F.C. players
National League (English football) players
English Football League players
Association football coaches